The Algeria–Tunisia football rivalry is a football rivalry between the national football teams of Algeria and Tunisia, having achieved three Africa Cup of Nations and two Arab Cups between the two countries.

The two nations have played 48 games against each other; Algeria leads in wins with 18 to Tunisia's 15, with the two sides drawing 15 times. The first unofficial match took place on 1 June 1957, in a friendly match between Tunisia and the FLN football team, when Algeria was a French colony. After the independence of Algeria, the first official match took place on 15 December 1963, in a friendly match at the Stade Chedly Zouiten in Tunisia.

The last defeat of Algeria against their neighbours dated back to 20 January 2017, during the 2017 Africa Cup of Nations which was hosted by Gabon.

History 
The first unofficial match took place on 1 June 1957, in a friendly match between Tunisia and the FLN football team, when Algeria was a French colony. It was at this time that the matches were the most regular. Indeed, the two teams met eight times, between June 1957 and October 1959, with eight victories for the Algerians.

After the independence of Algeria, the first official match took place on 15 December 1963, in a friendly match at the Stade Chedly Zouiten in Tunisia. The two teams met three times in the qualifying phase of the World Cup in 1970, 1978 and 1986.

Algeria and Tunisia played three times in official competitions: twice in the Africa Cup of Nations, in 2013 and 2017, which Tunisia won both times, and once in the Arab Cup in 2021, which Algeria won after beating Tunisia in the final.

List of matches

Major encounters

1975 Mediterranean Games

1979 Mediterranean Games

2013 Africa Cup of Nations

2017 Africa Cup of Nations

2021 FIFA Arab Cup

Statistics

Overall

Titles

References 

International association football rivalries
Tunisia
Tunisia national football team
football